Mont Lozère is the highest peak in the Cévennes, a subrange of the Massif Central in France.

Mont Lozère is commonly used for skiing during the winter months. It is also a popular destination for student groups during the summer months. It offers some stunning natural scenery and is covered by coniferous plantations and 'broom' scrub moorland.

Mount Lozere is the source of the River Tarn, and also the highest point on the Robert Louis Stevenson Trail (GR 70), a popular long-distance path following approximately the route travelled by Robert Louis Stevenson in 1878 and described in his book Travels with a Donkey in the Cévennes. The GR70 follows a draille (drove road) across the mountain, marked by montjoies (standing stones).

References 

Massif Central
Mountains of Lozère
Tourist attractions in Lozère